Mansfield is a historic home located at Montgomery Township in Franklin County, Pennsylvania. It was built about 1807, and is a two-story, three bay stone dwelling with a one-story, four bay rear wing.  It has a full-length, one-story, shed roofed front porch.  The property once included a saw mill and woolen factory.

It was listed on the National Register of Historic Places in 1979.

References 

Houses on the National Register of Historic Places in Pennsylvania
Houses completed in 1807
Houses in Franklin County, Pennsylvania
National Register of Historic Places in Franklin County, Pennsylvania